Liga ASOBAL 1995–96 season was the sixth since its establishment. The league was played in a round-robin format through 30 rounds. The team with most points earned was the champion. On the contrary, teams in 12th & 13th position had to play the permanence playoff, and teams in 14th & 15th position had to play the relegation playoff.

First phase

Overall standing

Second phase

permanence promotion

Ciudad Real remained in Liga ASOBAL. Cangas Frigorificos Morrazo played In–Out promotion.

relegation promotion

Conquense played In–Out playoff. CajaBilbao UPV Barakaldo relegated. Later, BM Conquense was relegated due to financial constraints and CajaBilbao UPV Barakaldo regained its seat in Liga ASOBAL.

In–Out playoffCangas Frigorificos del Morrazo remained in Liga ASOBAL.Conquense remained in Liga ASOBAL. Later, BM Conquense was relegated due to financial constraints and CajaBilbao UPV Barakaldo regained its seat in Liga ASOBAL.''

1995-96
handball
handball
Spain